The 1912 European Figure Skating Championships were held on February 10 to 11 in Stockholm, Sweden. Elite figure skaters competed for the title of European Champion in the category of men's singles.

Results

Men

Judges:
 A. Anderberg 
 Josef Fellner 
 E. Hörle 
 Eugen Minich  (Hungary)
 V. Sreznewsky

References

Sources
 Result List provided by the ISU

European Figure Skating Championships, 1912
European Figure Skating Championships
International sports competitions in Stockholm
February 1912 sports events
1910s in Stockholm
International figure skating competitions hosted by Sweden